Cassis, common name the helmet shells, is a genus of very large sea snails, marine gastropod mollusks in the family Cassidae, the helmet shells and their allies.
This is the type genus of the subfamily Cassinae.

Species
The genus Cassis includes  extant and extinct species:
 Cassis abbotti Bouchet, 1988
 † Cassis altispira  Beu 2010
 † Cassis birmanica  Vredenburg 1921
 † Cassis brasili (Cossmann & Pissarro, 1905) 
 † Cassis calusa Petuch and Berschauer 2018 
 Cassis cornuta (Linnaeus, 1758)
 † Cassis costulifera  Beu 2010
 † Cassis delta  Parker 1948
 † Cassis depressior  Martin 1879
 Cassis fimbriata Quoy & Gaimard, 1833
 Cassis flammea (Linnaeus, 1758)
 † Cassis flintensis  Mansfield 1940
 † Cassis floridensis  Tucker and Wilson 1932
 † Cassis glaucoides  Martin 1879
 † Cassis herklotsi  Martin 1879
 † Cassis ketteri  Parodiz and Tripp 1992
 Cassis kreipli Morrison, 2003
 † Cassis lelongi Gain, Belliard & Le Renard, 2017 
 † Cassis maccormacki  Olsson 1928
 Cassis madagascariensis Lamarck, 1822
 † Cassis mammillaris  Grateloup 1927
 Cassis nana Tenison-Woods, 1879
 † Cassis nigellensis Gain, Belliard & Le Renard, 2017 
 Cassis norai Prati Musetti, 1995
 Cassis nummulitiphila  Sacco 1890
 † Cassis parfouruorum Gain, Belliard & Le Renard, 2017 
 Cassis patamakanthini Parth, 2000
 † Cassis powelli Petuch and Berschauer, 2018 
 Cassis retusa  Michelotti 1861
 Cassis subtuberosa  Hanna 1926
 Cassis sulcifera  Sowerby 1850
 Cassis tessellata Gmelin, 1791
 Cassis togata  White 1887
 Cassis tuberosa (Linnaeus, 1758)
 Cassis vialensis  Fuchs 1870

Fossils of the sea snails within this genus have been found all over the world in sediments from Paleocene to Recent (age range: 66 to 0 million years ago).

Species brought into synonymy
 Cassis achatina Lamarck, 1816: synonym of Semicassis labiata (Perry, 1811)
 Cassis areola (Linnaeus, 1758): synonym of Phalium areola (Linnaeus, 1758)
 Cassis bituberculosa Martens, 1901: synonym of Echinophoria bituberculosa (Martens, 1901)
 Cassis callosa Röding, 1798: synonym of Nassarius gibbulosus (Linnaeus, 1758)
 Cassis centiquadrata (Valenciennes, 1832): synonym of Semicassis centiquadrata (Valenciennes, 1832)
 Cassis cernica Sowerby III, 1888: synonym of Casmaria ponderosa ponderosa (Link, 1807)
 Cassis coarctata G.B. Sowerby I, 1825: synonym of Cypraecassis coarctata (G.B. Sowerby I, 1825)
 Cassis coronadoi Crosse, 1867: synonym of Echinophoria coronadoi (Crosse, 1867)
 Cassis dalli Anderson, 1929: synonym of Echinophoria hadra (Woodring & Olsson, 1957)
 Cassis glans Röding, 1798: synonym of Demoulia abbreviata (Gmelin, 1791)
 Cassis glauca (Linnaeus, 1758): synonym of Phalium glaucum (Linnaeus, 1758)
 Cassis globulus Menke, 1829: synonym of Demoulia ventricosa (Lamarck, 1816)
 Cassis gracilenta Yokoyama, 1928: synonym of Cyllene gracilenta (Yokoyama, 1928)
 Cassis japonica Reeve, 1848: synonym of Semicassis bisulcata (Schubert & Wagner, 1829)
 Cassis labrosa Martini, 1773: synonym of Malea pomum (Linnaeus, 1758)
 Cassis ringens Swainson, 1822: synonym of Malea ringens (Swainson, 1822)
 Cassis rufa (Linnaeus, 1758): synonym of Cypraecassis rufa (Linnaeus, 1758)
 Cassis spinosa (Gronovius, 1781): synonym of Cassis tessellata Gmelin, 1791
 Cassis tenuis Wood, 1828: synonym of Cypraecassis tenuis (Wood, 1828)
 Cassis vibex (Linnaeus, 1758): synonym of Casmaria erinaceus (Linnaeus, 1758)
 Cassis wyvillei Watson, 1886: synonym of Echinophoria wyvillei (Watson, 1886)

References

External links 
 

Cassidae
Extant Paleocene first appearances